Debra Jean Entenman (née Rivers, born November 27, 1961) is an American politician who is the member of the Washington House of Representatives from the 47th district in King County. She is endorsed by The Seattle Times newspaper.

Early life and career

Entenman earned an AA from Highline Community College in 2001. She earned a BA in political science from Seattle University in 2003. She worked for the Children’s Alliance and worked for Congressman Adam Smith for 12 years, including service as his District Director. In 2015, Washington Governor Jay Inslee appointed Entenman to serve as a Trustee at Renton Technical College.

Political career

Election
Entenman was elected in the general election on November 6, 2018, winning 53 percent of the vote over 46 percent of Republican incumbent Mark Hargrove.

References

1961 births
21st-century American politicians
21st-century American women politicians
African-American state legislators in Washington (state)
Living people
Entenman, Debra
Women state legislators in Washington (state)
21st-century African-American women
21st-century African-American politicians
20th-century African-American people
20th-century African-American women